Stephen Mills  (23 September 18571 November 1948) was a senior Australian public servant, best known for his long association with the Department of Trade and Customs.

Life and career
Stephen Mills was born in Sydney on 23 September 1857 to parents Emily and John Mills.

Between 1913 and 1922, Mills was Comptroller-General of the Department of Trade and Customs.

Mills died on 1 November 1948, in Glen Iris, Melbourne and was cremated.

Awards
In June 1920, Mills was appointed a Companion of the Order of St Michael and St George, for his service as Controller-General of the Trade and Customs Department.

References

1857 births
1948 deaths
Australian Companions of the Order of St Michael and St George
20th-century Australian public servants